Erik Varga (born 9 June 1976) is a Slovak sport shooter who specializes in the trap. He is a member of the Hungarian community in Slovakia.

At the 2008 Olympic Games he finished in joint eighth place in the trap qualification, missing a place among the top six, who progressed to the final round.

At the 2012 Olympic Games he finished in twelfth place in the trap.

References

External links

1976 births
Living people
Sportspeople from Šaľa
Slovak male sport shooters
Shooters at the 2008 Summer Olympics
Shooters at the 2012 Summer Olympics
Shooters at the 2016 Summer Olympics
Olympic shooters of Slovakia
Trap and double trap shooters
Shooters at the 2015 European Games
European Games gold medalists for Slovakia
European Games silver medalists for Slovakia
European Games medalists in shooting
Shooters at the 2019 European Games
Hungarians in Slovakia
Shooters at the 2020 Summer Olympics
20th-century Slovak people
21st-century Slovak people